Orson F. Baldwin (November 3, 1881 – February 16, 1942) was a pitcher in Major League Baseball. He played for the St. Louis Cardinals in 1908.

References

External links

1881 births
1942 deaths
Major League Baseball pitchers
St. Louis Cardinals players
Sharon Steels players
Youngstown Champs players
Baseball players from Michigan
People from Carson City, Michigan